Teranishi (written: 寺西) is a Japanese surname. Notable people with the surname include:

, Japanese engineer
Rolly Teranishi (born 1963), Japanese musician
Teppei Teranishi (born 1980), American musician

Japanese-language surnames